Fred Lange-Nielsen (28 September 1919 – 28 December 1989) was a Norwegian doctor and jazz musician (bass, vocals), known in the early Oslo environments, and from several recordings.

Lange-Nielsen and Anton Jervell were the first to describe Jervell and Lange-Nielsen syndrome (JLNS) in 1953.

He played in String Swing (1937-1941), the quartet Hot Dogs, in Rowland Greenberg's orchestra (1941), the Oslo Swing Club's orchestra, the studio group Seven Cheerful and with Cecil Aagaard's "Swingsters" and quintet Sew-We-La (1950 53).

References

1919 births
1989 deaths
Norwegian jazz musicians
Norwegian cardiologists
19th-century Norwegian physicians
20th-century Norwegian physicians
20th-century Norwegian musicians